Signal compression is the use of various techniques to increase the quality or quantity of signal parameters transmitted through a given telecommunications channel.

Types of signal compression include:

Bandwidth compression
Data compression
Dynamic range compression
Gain compression
Image compression
Lossy compression
One-way compression function

Compression
Telecommunications techniques

he:דחיסת אותות